Funaria is a genus of approximately 210 species of moss. Funaria hygrometrica is the most common species. Funaria hygrometrica is called “cord moss” because of the twisted seta which is very hygroscopic and untwists when moist. The name is derived from the Latin word “funis”, meaning "a rope". In funaria root like structures called rhizoids are present.

Capsules are abundant with the moss surviving as spore when conditions are not suitable.

Moss plant Funaria grows in dense patches or cushions in moist shady and cool places on rocks,walls or crevices during the rainy seasons. It has a height of 3–5 cm, a radial symmetry with a differentiation of an axis or stem, leaves or phylloids are multicellular colorless branched rhizoids with oblique septa.

These are primitive multicellular, autotrophic, shade loving, amphibious plants. They reproduce by spore formation. They have no vascular system. Root like structures called rhizoids are present. They show alternation of generation i.e. the gametophytic stage alternates with the sporophytic stage.

External structure of gametophyte 
Plant body is gametophytic and consists of two stages: juvenile and adult. 

The juvenile stage is represented by "primary protonema" (thread-like structures formed directly by spore germination).

The adult stage is represented by leafy gametophore which is differentiated into rhizoids, axis and leaves. Rhizoids arise from the base of the axis and they are slender, branched , obliquely septate and provides anchorage for the bryophyte. The axis is a stem-like structure arising from the rhizoid, long, slender, monopodially branched. The each branch is extra axilliary arising form the base of a leaf. The leaves are sessile, oblong-ovate with entire margin and pointed apex. Each leaf is transversed by a mid rib. Leaves are born spirally around the axis.

Morphology 
The adult plant body is foliose gametophyte which is leafy and branched which is differentiated into axis, leaves, rhizoids.

Axis/Stem: Small, erect, upright, slender, monopodially branched

Leaves: Spirally arranged around the axis. Flat, green with a well-defined mid-rib. Lower leaves are smaller and scattered and upper leaves are large and crowded.

Rhizoids: Basal, branched, multicellular, obliquely septated mainly for absorption of minerals and anchorage to substratum.

T.S. of axis 
Divided into 3 regions:  

 epidermis (outermost single layered protective layer bearing chlorophyllated cells)  
 cortex (layer of parenchymatous cells between epidermis and central conducting strands; young cells have chloroplasts and older cells lack chloroplasts)  
 inner conducting strands (made of long, narrow, slender, dead cells which is mainly used for mechanical support to the axis and for water conduction.

T.S of leaf 
The transverse section of the leaf shows a well-defined mid-rib with two lateral wings except in the mid-rib region. There are single-layered parenchymatous polygonal cells with prominent chloroplasts. The central part of the mid-rib has a narrow conducting strand of thick walled cells that helps in conduction.

Accepted species 
 Funaria acicularis Müll. Hal.
 Funaria acidota (Taylor) Broth.
 Funaria acutifolia (Hampe) Broth.
 Funaria aequidens Lindb. ex Broth.
 Funaria altiseta (Herzog) Broth.
 Funaria altissima Dixon
 Funaria americana Lindb.
 Funaria ampliretis (Rehmann ex Müll. Hal.) Broth.
 Funaria andicola (Mitt.) Broth.
 Funaria anomala Jur.
 Funaria antarctica (Müll. Hal.) Broth.
 Funaria apiahyensis (Müll. Hal.) Broth.
 Funaria apiculatopilosa Cardot
 Funaria apophysata (Taylor) Broth.
 Funaria arctica (Berggr.) Kindb.
 Funaria arenicola (Lazarenko) Loeske
 Funaria aristatula Müll. Hal.
 Funaria balansae (Besch.) Broth.
 Funaria beccarii (Hampe) Broth.	
 Funaria bergiana (Hornsch.) Broth.
 Funaria berteroana Hampe ex Müll. Hal.
 Funaria beyrichii Hampe
 Funaria bogosica Müll. Hal.	
 Funaria bonplandii (Hook.) Broth.
 Funaria borbonica (Besch.) Broth.
 Funaria borneensis Dixon
 Funaria brassii (E.B. Bartram) W. Schultze-Motel
 Funaria buseana (Dozy & Molk.) Broth.
 Funaria calvescens Schwägr.
 Funaria cameruniae Dixon
 Funaria campylopodioides (Müll. Hal.) Broth.
 Funaria capillaris Warnst.
 Funaria capillipes Broth.
 Funaria cartilaginea (Müll. Hal.) Broth.
 Funaria chevalieri P. de la Varde
 Funaria chilensis (Thér.) Thér.
 Funaria chiloensis (Mitt.) Broth.
 Funaria clavaeformis (Müll. Hal. & Hampe) Broth.
 Funaria clavata (Mitt.) Magill
 Funaria clavellata (Mitt.) Broth.
 Funaria commixta Thér.
 Funaria commutata (Durieu & Mont.) Lindb.
 Funaria contorta (E.B. Bartram) W. Schultze-Motel
 Funaria convexa Spruce
 Funaria costesii Thér.
 Funaria curvi-apiculata (Müll. Hal.) Broth.
 Funaria curvipes (Müll. Hal.) Broth.
 Funaria curviseta (Schwägr.) Milde
 Funaria decaryi Thér.
 Funaria delicatula Thér.
 Funaria deserticola Trab.
 Funaria discelioides Müll. Hal.
 Funaria diversinervis (Müll. Hal.) Broth.
 Funaria dozyana (Müll. Hal.) Broth.
 Funaria eberhardtii (Broth. & Paris) Broth.
 Funaria erectiuscula Mitt.
 Funaria euryloma Dixon
 Funaria eurystoma (Mitt.) Broth.
 Funaria excurrentinervis Cardot & P. de la Varde
 Funaria faucium (Herzog) Broth.
 Funaria flava (Müll. Hal.) Broth.
 Funaria flavicans Michx.
 Funaria flexiseta (Müll. Hal.) Broth.
 Funaria fontana (Herzog) Broth.
 Funaria fontanesii Schwägr.
 Funaria fritzei Geh.
 Funaria fuscescens Mitt.
 Funaria glabripes (Müll. Hal.) Broth.
 Funaria gracilis (Hook. f. & Wilson) Broth.
 Funaria grossidens Broth.
 Funaria hildebrandtii (Müll. Hal.) Broth.
 Funaria holstii Broth.
 Funaria hookeriana Thér.
 Funaria hosseusii E.B. Bartram
 Funaria husnotii (Schimp. ex Besch.) Broth.
 Funaria hygrometrica Hedw.
 Funaria hygrometrica f. breviseta (Broth.) Cufod. 
 Funaria hygrometrica var. calvescens (Schwägr.) Mont.
 Funaria hygrometrica x physcomitrium acuminatum L. Bauer & Broseg
 Funaria imerinensis Cardot
 Funaria incompleta Müll. Hal.
 Funaria incurvifolia Müll. Hal. ex E. Britton
 Funaria inflata Müll. Hal.
 Funaria integra (Müll. Hal.) Broth.
 Funaria jamesonii (Taylor) Taylor
 Funaria japonica Broth.
 Funaria javanica (Dozy & Molk.) Broth.
 Funaria kilimandscharica Müll. Hal.
 Funaria koelzei E.B. Bartram
 Funaria krausei (Besch.) Geh. & Herzog
 Funaria laevis Mitt.
 Funaria laxissima Müll. Hal.
 Funaria leibergii (E. Britton) Broth.
 Funaria lepervanchei (Besch.) Broth.
 Funaria lignicola Broth.
 Funaria limbata (Müll. Hal.) Broth.
 Funaria lindigii (Hampe) Broth.
 Funaria linearidens Müll. Hal.
 Funaria longicollis Dixon
 Funaria longiseta (Schimp.) Broth.
 Funaria ludoviciae Broth. & Paris
 Funaria luteo-limbata Broth.
 Funaria lutescens (Hampe) Broth.
 Funaria macrocarpa (Schimp.) R.H. Zander
 Funaria macrospora R.S. Williams
 Funaria maireana Copp.
 Funaria marginatula (Müll. Hal.) Cardot
 Funaria mathwesii (Hook. f.) Broth.
 Funaria mauritiana (Schimp. ex Besch.) Broth.
 Funaria mayottensis (Besch.) Broth.
 Funaria meeseacea Müll. Hal.
 Funaria megalostoma Mitt.
 Funaria microcarpa (Müll. Hal.) Broth.
 Funaria micropyxis (Müll. Hal.) Broth.
 Funaria microstoma Bruch ex Schimp.
 Funaria minuticaulis (Müll. Hal. ex Geh.) Watts & Whitel.
 Funaria mittenii (Dozy & Molk.) Broth.
 Funaria muhlenbergii Turner
 Funaria muhlenbergii var. alpina (J.J. Amann) Castelli
 Funaria nilotica Broth.
 Funaria noumeana (Besch.) Broth.
 Funaria nubica Müll. Hal.
 Funaria obtusa (Hedw.) Lindb.
 Funaria obtusa var. ahnfeltii (Fr.) Kindb. 
 Funaria obtusa var. notarisii (Schimp.) Pavletic
 Funaria obtusata Schimp.
 Funaria obtuso-apiculata (Müll. Hal.) Broth.
 Funaria oligophylla (Müll. Hal.) Broth.
 Funaria orizabensis Müll. Hal.
 Funaria orthocarpa Mitt.
 Funaria ouropratensis (Paris) Thér.
 Funaria papillosa (Müll. Hal.) Wijk & Margad.
 Funaria paucifolia (Müll. Hal.) Broth.
 Funaria pellucida (Müll. Hal.) Broth.
 Funaria perlaxa Thér.
 Funaria perrottetii (Müll. Hal.) Broth.
 Funaria pilifera (Mitt.) Broth.
 Funaria plagiothecia (Müll. Hal.) Broth.
 Funaria planifolia (Thwaites & Mitt.) Broth.
 Funaria polaris Bryhn
 Funaria porteri Thér.
 Funaria producta (Mitt.) Broth.
 Funaria puiggarii (Geh. & Hampe) Broth.
 Funaria pulchella H. Philib.
 Funaria pulchra Dixon & P. de la Varde
 Funaria pulchricolor Müll. Hal.
 Funaria ramulosa (Hampe) Paris
 Funaria renauldii (Thér.) Cardot
 Funaria rhizomatica (Müll. Hal.) Broth.
 Funaria rhizophylla (Sakurai) Sakurai
 Funaria rhomboidea J. Shaw
 Funaria riparia Lindb.
 Funaria robustior (Müll. Hal.) Broth.
 Funaria rottleri (Schwägr.) Broth.
 Funaria saharae Trab.
 Funaria sartorii Müll. Hal.
 Funaria schinzii (Geh.) Broth.
 Funaria schnyderi Müll. Hal.
 Funaria serrata Brid.
 Funaria serricola (Müll. Hal.) Broth.
 Funaria sickenbergeri Müll. Hal.
 Funaria sinuato-limbata Cardot & P. de la Varde
 Funaria sipascoyae (Herzog) Broth.
 Funaria sovatensis Schimp. ex Müll. Hal.
 Funaria spathulata Schimp. ex Müll. Hal.
 Funaria spathulifolia (Cardot & Thér.) Broth.
 Funaria subcuspidata Broth.
 Funaria suberecta Mitt.
 Funaria subimmarginata Cardot & P. de la Varde
 Funaria subleptopoda Hampe
 Funaria submarginata (Müll. Hal.) Broth.
 Funaria subnuda Taylor
 Funaria subplanifolia Broth.
 Funaria subtilis (Müll. Hal.) Broth.
 Funaria subulata (E.B. Bartram) W. Schultze-Motel
 Funaria succuleata (Wager & C.H. Wright) Broth. ex Magill
 Funaria tenella Müll. Hal.
 Funaria trumpffii (Müll. Hal.) Broth.
 Funaria uleana (Müll. Hal.) Broth.
 Funaria undulata (Hampe) Broth.
 Funaria urceolata (Mitt.) Magill
 Funaria usambarica Broth.
 Funaria valdiviae Müll. Hal.
 Funaria varia (Mitt.) Broth.
 Funaria verrucosa (Müll. Hal.) Broth.
 Funaria volkensii Broth.
 Funaria wallichii (Mitt.) Broth.
 Funaria wichurae (M. Fleisch.) Broth.
 Funaria wijkii R.S. Chopra

References

External links

Funariales
Moss genera
Taxa named by Johann Hedwig